Alexander Frank Downie, OBE, MLC (born 1945, Douglas) is a Manx politician and former marine engineer. He is a member of the Legislative Council of the Isle of Man and a former Trade and Industry Minister of the Government.  He was a Member of the House of Keys from 1991 until his election to the Legislative Council in 2005.  Before going into politics, he was marine seagoing engineer for various companies and self-employed in the heating maintenance business.

Personal life
Downie was born in 1945 in Douglas, Isle of Man.

Downie is a freemason. As of April 2017, he is the Deputy Provincial Grand Master for the Isle of Man.

Ministerial positions
Minister of Trade and Industry, 2002–2006
Minister of Agriculture, Fisheries and Forestry, 1999–2002

References

External links
Alex Downie on MHKstheyworkforyou.org

Members of the Legislative Council of the Isle of Man
Members of the House of Keys 1991–1996
Members of the House of Keys 1996–2001
Members of the House of Keys 2001–2006
Living people
Manx Freemasons
Officers of the Order of the British Empire
1945 births